Oosterellidae is an extinct ammonoid cephalopod family belonging to the superfamily Perisphinctoidea. These fast-moving nektonic carnivores lived during the Cretaceous.

Genera

Oosterella
Pseudoosterella

Distribution
Fossils of species within this genus have been found in the Cretaceous sediments of Argentina, Austria, Colombia, Czech Republic, France, Hungary, Italy, Mexico, Morocco, Romania and Slovakia.

References

Ammonitida families
Perisphinctoidea
Cretaceous ammonites
Ammonites of Europe
Early Cretaceous first appearances
Early Cretaceous extinctions